K-7 is a  state highway in the U.S. state of Kansas. It is mostly a small country highway winding its way through the Osage Questas and Glaciated Regions of eastern Kansas, although a portion of the highway passes through the Kansas City metropolitan area. Significant portions of the highway overlap with U.S. Route 169 (US-169) and US-73. It also has junctions with two Interstate highways, Interstate 35 (I-35) in Olathe and I-70 in Bonner Springs. The portion of K-7 between Leavenworth and the Nebraska state line has been designated the "Glacial Hills Scenic Byway."

Route description

The Kansas Department of Transportation (KDOT) tracks the traffic levels on its highways, and in 2018, they determined that on average the traffic varied from 100 vehicles per day slightly south of the overlap with K-31 to 32200 vehicles per day slightly north of K-10 interchange. The AADT was 195 vehicles per day near the northern terminus and 2040 vehicles per day near the southern terminus. The section of K-7 that overlaps US-69 and US-54 by Fort Scott and the section from the south end of the US-169 overlap by Osawatomie north to US-59 in Atchison is included in the National Highway System. The National Highway System is a system of highways important to the nation's defense, economy, and mobility. K-7 also connects to the National Highway System at its junctions with US-166, US-160 in Columbus, and US-36 north of Atchison. The  section of K-7 in Columbus is maintained by the city. The  section within Girard is maintained by the city. The section of K-7 from I-35 to Harold Street in Olathe is maintained by the city. The section of K-7 in Leavenworth from Limit Street north to the end of the overlap with K-92 is maintained by the city. The entire section within Atchison is maintained by the city.

Oklahoma to Fort Scott

K-7 begins at the Oklahoma–Kansas state line. concurrent with  US-69. K-7 and US-69 split at an intersection with US-160 in Columbus. K-7 then goes north to Scammon, where it meets K-102. Five miles north of Cherokee, it intersects K-126 and then intersects K-47 at Girard. It then continues north from Girard, passing just west of Farlington. Near Hiattville, it intersects K-39 and turns east, then northeast. Five miles south of Fort Scott, K-7 intersects US-69 at a freeway interchange, and K-7 overlaps with US-69 into Fort Scott.

Fort Scott to Olathe

While in Fort Scott, K-7 and US-69 intersect US-54 and K-7 overlaps with US-54 west for four miles (6 km). It then turns north again, and alternates between going north and going west before entering Devon. It continues north to K-31, with which it overlaps for a mile going east. It then turns north and goes through Mound City, intersecting K-52 there. While overlapping US-169, it follows a freeway alignment that bypasses Osawatomie and Paola before meeting K-68. After K-68, the freeway bypasses Hillsdale and Spring Hill before turning into expressway. The overlap with US-169 ends at its intersection with I-35, US-50 and US-56 at Olathe.

Olathe to Bonner Springs

In Olathe, K-7 alternates between northbound and westbound routings before turning north and becoming freeway. On the border between Olathe and Lenexa, K-7 intersects the K-10 freeway. It continues north, then turns northwest to cross the Kansas River and enter Bonner Springs, where it immediately intersects K-32. It turns north to intersect I-70, the Kansas Turnpike, then turns northwest to intersect US-24, US-40, and US-73. At this point, which is on the border between Bonner Springs and Kansas City, an overlap with US-73 begins.

Bonner Springs to Nebraska
K-7 and US-73 then go north along the western city limits of Kansas City before entering Lansing. They continue north through Lansing and upon entering Leavenworth, intersect K-5. Also in Leavenworth, they intersect K-92 and they briefly run concurrent with K-92 before separating and turning west to leave Leavenworth.K-7 and US-73 leave Leavenworth going west until intersecting K-192, then turn north, intersecting K-74 near Potter. At Atchison, K-7's overlap with US-73 ends at its intersection with US-59. After winding its way through Atchison, K-7 continues north and intersects K-20 near Bendena and US-36 west of Troy. The highway turns northwest along an alignment closely parallelling the Missouri River and after passing through White Cloud, ends at the Nebraska border northwest of White Cloud. No corresponding state highway in Nebraska continues from K-7, although a county road continues northwest to Rulo, Nebraska.

History

Establishment
K-7 is one of the original State Highways that was designated in 1927, and at that time extended from the Oklahoma border to US-40 and US-73E west of Kansas City. Then between 1933 and 1934, K-7 had been extended north along the former K-16 to US-36 in Troy and US-73E was renumbered as US-73 and truncated to US-40 and US-24 west of Kansas City. Also by 1936, US-169 had been extended into Kansas and overlapped K-7 from slightly south of Osawatomie to Olathe. In an October 11, 1935 resolution, it was approved to extend K-7 further north from US-36 in Sparks to the Nebraska border. Then by 1937 the section from Sparks to the Nebraska border had been completed.

Realignments

In a May 13, 1936 resolution, the northbound and southbound lanes were separated on K-7 to prevent traffic from crossing the northbound and southbound lanes of US-69, a few miles south of Fort Scott. In a November 6, 1936 resolution, K-7 was slightly realigned just south of Leavenworth to eliminate two turns. In a June 13, 1938 resolution K-7 and US-169 was slightly realigned by Hillsdale to eliminate two sharp curves. In a December 9, 1941 resolution a roughly 2.6 mile section of K-7 was slightly realigned north of Sparks. In a March 26, 1952 resolution K-7 was realigned slightly in Olathe. In a December 15, 1953 resolution K-7 and US-54 was realigned slightly north, northwest of Fort Scott. In an August 30, 1954 resolution K-7 and US-73 was realigned slightly just north of the Atchison-Leavenworth County line to eliminate two turns. In an October 19, 1955 resolution it was realigned slightly north of Farlinville to eliminate a sharp curve. In a November 14, 1956 resolution, K-7 was realigned slightly north of Bonner Springs to meet a new interchange built on US-24, US-40 and US-73. In a February 25, 1957 resolution a 4.5 mile section of K-7 was realigned slightly west, northeast of Olathe. In a December 10, 1957 resolution K-7 was realigned to the east of Bonner Springs. K-103 originally overlapped K-7 from K-103's current western terminus north to the current US-400 intersection, then continued west to US-160 south of McCune. Then in 1958 US-160 was realigned east along K-103 from K-103's original western terminus south of McCune to K-7 then continued east to US-69 and at that time K-103 was truncated to its current western terminus. Until 1959 in Troy, K-7 originally turned east onto Jones Street then turned north onto Park Street then east onto State Street then north onto Center Street then east onto Poplar Street then north onto Main Street to US-36. Then in a February 11, 1959 resolution the turn at Jones Street was eliminated and it was realigned to go straight north to US-36. In a February 14, 1968 resolution, a 6.15 mile section of K-7 and US-73 was moved west onto a new alignment south of Atchison. In a June 12, 1969 resolution K-7 and US-169 was realigned slightly eastward from slightly south of Paola to slightly south of Spring Hill. In a July 19, 1972 resolution K-7 was realigned slightly southeast onto a new alignment or US-169 southwest of Paola. In a September 19, 1980 resolution, K-7 and US-169 was realigned slightly to the west of Spring Hill. In a January 7, 1982 resolution K-31 was realigned slightly where it crosses the Little Osage River and at that time a section of K-7 north of the overlap with K-31 was moved slightly. In a December 16, 1983 resolution the overlap with K-10 was eliminated by Shawnee, K-10 eastward from K-7 was redesignated as K-12, and K-10 eastward from K-7 was redesignated as K-12. In an October 7, 1985 resolution, US-36 was realigned onto a new alignment from southwest of Highland to east of Troy and the old section of US-36 and K-7 from west of Troy to Sparks was redesignated solely as K-7. Until late 1996, K-39 overlapped K-7. Then in a November 18, 1996 resolution the overlap with K-39 was eliminated and K-39 was truncated to end at K-7. In a March 9, 1999 resolution US-73 and K-7 was realigned onto a new alignment from Leavenworth to Lowemont. In a March 10, 2003 resolution, a roughly 3.5 mile section of US-73 and K-7 was relocated slightly onto a new alignment. Until 2004, K-7 turned east and went through Troy where it crosses US-36. Then in a May 25, 2004 resolution the turn was eliminated and K-7 went straight north and crossed US-36 west of Troy. In a November 3, 2006 resolution K-7 was realigned, slightly south of Girard to eliminated two turns.

Improvements
The intersection of K-7 and 43rd Street in Shawnee is going to be reconstructed from August to November 2020. The improvements are to support the development of Heartland Logistics, a proposed industrial park on 150 acres at the northwest corner of 43rd and K-7. The improvements will include additional turn lanes, new detector loops, new traffic signals and grading.

Major intersections

See also

 List of state highways in Kansas

References

External links

 Kansas Highways Routelog (Richie Kennedy)
 K-7 Corridor Management Plan
 Kansas Department of Transportation State Map
 KDOT: Historic State Maps

007
Transportation in the Kansas City metropolitan area
Transportation in Cherokee County, Kansas
Transportation in Crawford County, Kansas
Transportation in Bourbon County, Kansas
Transportation in Linn County, Kansas
Transportation in Miami County, Kansas
Transportation in Johnson County, Kansas
Transportation in Wyandotte County, Kansas
Transportation in Leavenworth County, Kansas
Transportation in Atchison County, Kansas
Transportation in Doniphan County, Kansas